Iván Cervantes Montero (born 2 May 1982) is a Spanish motorcycle enduro racer from Cambrils (Tarragona) and a four-times world enduro champion.

Career
Cervantes started out as a motocross rider, a discipline in which he holds five Spanish national titles, before moving on to enduro racing. In 2005, at the age of 23, he made motorcycle racing history by becoming the first Spanish enduro world champion in category E1 enduro (100 to 125 cc two-stroke or 175 - 250 cc four-stroke). In 2006, he successfully defended his title. The following year, he won the world championship in the E3 category (290 to 500 cc two-stroke or 475 - 650 cc four-stroke). In the 2008 season, continuing with KTM, he finished second to Honda's Mika Ahola.

He also won the 2008/09 FIM Indoor Enduro World Cup, winning five races. In 2009/10 he was runner-up with one win and six second-place finishes. He returned for the 2011/12 season, resulting 5th with two podiums.

In 2011 Ivan changed bike to GasGas.

In various press interviews, Cervantes has stated that his goal is to win two world titles in each of the three enduro categories, and then to try to win the Dakar Rally.

On 19 July 2021, he announced his brand-new partnership (along with Ricky Carmichael) with Triumph Motorcycles. They will act as brand ambassadors for the new line of off-road motorcycles being developed by Triumph for use in Motorcross/Supercross racing.

Career summary

External links

Official site
Interview with "ElMundo.es" (Spanish)

1982 births
Living people
Dakar Rally drivers
Enduro riders
Spanish motorcycle racers
Motorcycle racers from Catalonia
Place of birth missing (living people)